The Tiruvelukkutrirukkai is a Tamil Hindu work of literature penned by Thirumangai Alvar, one of the twelve Alvars of Sri Vaishnavism. Composed of a single hymn, it is part of the compendium of hymns called the Naalayira Divya Prabandham.

Structure 
Composed in a poetic style known as the ratha bandham, the structure of this work consists of the inclusion of the Tamil terms of the numbers one to seven throughout the hymn. These numbers are arranged in both an ascending and descending order of frequency within the verses of the work, such that they form both an upright and an inverted pyramid that resemble a Pascal's triangle; the resulting arrangement looks like a ratha, the Sanskrit term for a chariot.

Hymns 

The verses of the Tiruvelukkutrirukkai are replete with numbers, describing and exalting the attributes of the preserver deity, Vishnu:

See also 

 Ciriya Tirumatal
 Periya Tiruvantati
 Tiruchanda Viruttam

References

External links 
Thiruvezhukkutrirukkai
Naalayira Divya Prabandham
Vaishnava texts
Tamil Hindu literature